Hassan Youssef (born 14 April 1939) is an Egyptian actor and director. He performed in many films since 1960s and indicated that he made fifteen films with the famous Egyptian actress Soad Hosny all of which were successful at the box office (the interview is available on YouTube). He also acted in several dramatic series in early 1980s including Dalia the Egyptian with the famous Egyptian actor Salah Zulfikar, and featuring actress Madiha Salem as Dalia. He acted in the famously drama series Layaly El Helmeya in mid 1980s.

He has been married to former actress Shams al-Baroudi since 1970. They have four children, including a son, Omar H. Youssef.

On July 11, 2011, on the road between Cairo and Alexandria, a group of thugs attacked Hassan. Hassan said that revolutionaries should help protect the road rather than demonstrate in Tahrir Square.

He was amongst the five Egyptian cinema figures honoured at the 20th National Cinema Festival held in October 2016 in Egypt.

Filmography

Films

Television series

References

External links

 
 "Actress Shams al-Baroudy releases a statement concerning her husband actor Hassan Youssif." (Archive) Elcinema.com. DAMLAG S.A.E.

1934 births
Living people
Egyptian male film actors
Place of birth missing (living people)